Chak-e Nar (also Romanized as Chak-e Nār) is a village in Horgan Rural District, in the Central District of Neyriz County, Fars Province, Iran. At the 2006 census, its population was 16, in 4 families.

References 

Populated places in Neyriz County